Rhodes House is a building part of the University of Oxford in England. It is located on South Parks Road in central Oxford, and was built in memory of Cecil Rhodes, an alumnus of the university and a major benefactor. It is listed Grade II* on the National Heritage List for England.

History 
The will of Cecil Rhodes (1853–1902) created scholarships that became known as Rhodes Scholarships, administered by the Rhodes Trust.

Construction of Rhodes House began in 1926 after the Rhodes Trust purchased the two-acre plot from Wadham College the previous year. The mansion was designed by architect Sir Herbert Baker and modelled on the Cape Dutch farmhouse design and traditional English Country mansions. This is reflected in the large beams, trans-domed windows and its Tetra-style portico. The square rubble walls were designed to be consistent with the Western European 17th century architecture of the Oxford University campus. Other features include the open-well staircase constructed from oak, featuring shaped balusters and carved eagle finials. Construction was completed in 1928 and the building and its library were handed over to Oxford University.

Rhodes House was commissioned by the Rhodes Trust as a memorial to Cecil Rhodes, to act as a centre for research for the "British Empire and Commonwealth, of African and the United States of America", and to be the headquarters of the Rhodes Scholarship system and Rhodes Trust.

Sir Herbert Baker, described as "Cecil Rhodes' own architect", was the sole-architect of Rhodes House. Architectural sculpture was provided by Charles Wheeler, who also worked on other inter-war colonial buildings including: India House, South Africa House and the Neuve Chapelle Indian Memorial. Rhodes House features a series of public rooms included a library, reading room, lecture hall and seminar rooms, a hall in which the Rhodes Scholars hold their annual dinner and the residence for the Rhodes Trust Oxford Secretary or Warden.

During 1931, Albert Einstein delivered a series of three lectures at Rhodes House. Edmund Bowen, a chemistry don at the university, saved the blackboard used in the second lecture (on 16 May). Einstein's Blackboard, now an iconic object, can still be seen at the Museum of the History of Science in Oxford, formally presented by Sir Francis Wylie, the Warden of Rhodes House at the time.

Rhodes House Library 
When Rhodes House was completed all the material relating to the British Empire and U.S. were transferred from the Bodleian Library. Also known as the Bodleian Library of Commonwealth & African Studies at Rhodes House. In 1990 the library held more 330,000 books and the archives relating to USA and other former colonies and dominions of the British Empire. The Library was a key research centre in the UK.

In 2014 the Library moved to the Weston Library.  The Library is now known as the Commonwealth and African Studies Collections.

Portraits at Rhodes House 

Rhodes House houses a significant collection of paintings and photographic portraits and busts, including of:

 Queen Elizabeth II
 Cecil Rhodes, the Founder of the Rhodes Scholarships 
 John McCall MacBain, philanthropist
Zambian human rights activist Lucy Banda-Sichone; her portrait, unveiled in 2015, was the first of a woman Rhodes Scholar ever displayed in Rhodes House.
Human rights activist and constitutional lawyer, Dr Menaka Guruswamy.
Former US President Bill Clinton
Former US President Ronald Reagan
Philosopher and first African-American Rhodes Scholar Alain Locke 
Former Jamaican Prime Minister Norman Manley
Jamaican cultural icon Rex Nettleford
 George Robert Parkin, the founding Organizing Secretary of the Rhodes Trust
 Busts of early Rhodes Trustees Viscount Milner and Otto Beit
 Canadian neuroscientist Wilder Penfield 
Former Australian Prime Minister Bob Hawke
President Wasim Sajjad (Pakistan)
Former Prime Minister John Turner (Canada)
Former Prime Minister Dominic Mintoff (Malta)
Neurophysiologist and Nobel Prize winner, Sir John Eccles
Pharmacologist and Nobel Prize winner, Sir Howard Florey
Former United States national security advisor, Susan Rice
Anti-Apartheid activist, Bram Fischer
Former United States health secretary, Sylvia Burwell
Canada's Minister of Foreign Affairs, Chrystia Freeland
Philanthropist, Chuck Feeney
Economist and Nobel Prize winner, Professor Michael Spence
 Former Chairs of the Rhodes Trust, including Sir Kenneth Wheare, Robert Blake, Baron Blake, and Lord Waldegrave of North Hill
 Former Wardens of Rhodes House – Sir Francis Wylie, Sir Carleton Allen, Sir Edgar Williams, Dr Robin Fletcher, Sir Anthony Kenny, Dr John Rowett, Sir Colin Lucas, and Professor Donald Markwell. 
Former South African President Nelson Mandela, who joined his name with Cecil Rhodes in the Mandela Rhodes Foundation

The Rhodes Trust
The Rhodes Trust is based at Rhodes House. The Rhodes Trust, established in 1902 under the terms and conditions of the will of Cecil Rhodes, and by subsequent Acts of Parliament, is an educational charity whose principal activity is to support scholars selected from the citizens of 14 specified geographic constituencies to study at the University of Oxford. Rhodes Scholarships for up to three years have been awarded annually since 1903. The goals of Cecil Rhodes in creating the Scholarships were to promote civic-minded leadership among young people with (in the words of his 1899 Will) "moral force of character and instincts to lead", and (in the words of a 1901 codicil to his Will) to help "render war impossible" through promoting understanding between the great powers.

In 2002, in partnership with Nelson Mandela, the Rhodes Trust established the Mandela Rhodes Scholarship. The Rhodes Trust provides the Rhodes Scholarships in partnership with the Second Century Founders, John McCall MacBain O.C., the Atlantic Philanthropies, and other benefactors. In 2016 the Trust announced a partnership with Atlantic Philanthropies to create an Atlantic Institute, which has offices at Rhodes House. Funding for this project allowed the Trust to expand the total number of Rhodes Scholars and to offer scholarships to students from Syria, Jordan, Lebanon, Palestine, Israel, China, and West Africa.

In 2017, the Schmidt Science Fellows programme was launched as a partnership between Schmidt Futures and the Rhodes Trust. The programme was established to facilitate cross-discipline research that could lead to scientific breakthroughs.

The Rhodes Trust is governed by a Board of Trustees, and the Warden of Rhodes House acts as Secretary to the Trust.

Current trustees
The following are trustees:
 Dapo Akande (professor of public international law at the University of Oxford)
 Mr Andrew Banks (Florida & St Edmund Hall 1976) - Co-Founder, ABRY Partners 
 Ms Neeti Bhalla (Kenya & Templeton 1998) - Executive Vice President and Chief Investment Officer for Liberty Mutual Insurance Group
 Mr Mike Fitzpatrick (Chairman of Pacific Current Group)
Dame Helen Ghosh - Master of Balliol College, Oxford
Mr Don Gogel (New Jersey & Balliol 1971) - Chairman and CEO of Clayton, Dubilier & Rice
Mr Glen James former partner of Slaughter and May
Dr Tariro Makadzange (Zimbabwe & Balliol 1999) - Director of Biology at Gilead Sciences 
Ms Swati Mylavarapu (Florida & Wolfson 2005) - Founder of Incite.org, a values-based investor and co-founder of Arena 
Professor Karen O'Brien (Head of Humanities Division and Professor of English Literature)
Kate O'Regan (Director of the Bonavero Institute of Human Rights at the University of Oxford)
Mr Chris Oechsli - President and CEO of The Atlantic Philanthropies  
Dilip Shanghvi - Co-founder of Sun Pharmaceuticals 
Judge Karen Stevenson (United States Magistrate and Judge)
Dr Peter Stamos (California & Worcester 1981) - Founder, Chief Executive Officer of Stamos Capital Partners 
Mr Bob Sternfels (California & Worcester 1992) Senior Partner at McKinsey & Company 
Sir John Hood (New Zealand & Worcester College, 1976), Chairman (since 2011)
Professor John Bell (Alberta & Magdalen College, 1975) (since 2002)
Professor Ngaire Woods (New Zealand & Balliol College, 1987) (since 2009)
Dominic Barton (British Columbia & Brasenose College, 1984) (since 2010)
Don Gogel (New Jersey & Balliol College, 1971) (since 2010)
Professor Margaret MacMillan (since 2010)
John McCall MacBain (Quebec & Wadham College, 1980) (since 2010)
Karen Stevenson (Maryland & Magdalen College, 1979) (since 2010)
John Wylie (Queensland & Balliol College, 1983) (since 2010)
Glen James (since 2014)
Andrew Banks (Florida & St Edmund Hall, 1976) (since 2014)
Professor Dame Carol Robinson (since 2015)
Nicholas Oppenheimer (since 2015)
Professor Elleke Boehmer (South Africa-at-Large and St John's College, 1985) (since 2016)
Dilip Shanghvi (since 2017)
Mike Fitzpatrick (Western Australia & St John's College, 1975) (since 2018)
Peter Stamos (California & Worcester College, 1981) (since 2018)

Emeritus trustees
Julian Thompson (Diocesan College, Rondebosch and Worcester College, 1953) (trustee since 2002, emeritus since 2015)
Michael McCaffery (Pennsylvania & Merton College, 1975) (trustee since 2007, emeritus since 2018)

Notable former trustees
Lord Butler of Brockwell
Sir Rod Eddington
Earl Grey
Viscount Hailsham
Rudyard Kipling

List of chairmen of the Trust
Earl of Rosebery 1902–1917
Viscount Milner 1917–1925
Sir Otto Beit 1925–1930
Lord Lovat 1930–1933
Rt Hon. L. S. Amery 1933–1955
Sir Edward Peacock 1955–1962
Sir Kenneth Wheare 1962–1969
Sir George Abell 1969–1974
Viscount Harcourt 1974–1979
Sir William Paton 1979–1982
Lord Blake 1983–1987
Sir John Baring, later Lord Ashburton 1987–1999
Sir Richard Southwood 1999–2002
Lord Waldegrave of North Hill 2002–2011
Sir John Hood 2011–Present

List of wardens
Sir Francis Wylie 1903–1931
Professor Sir Carleton Allen 1931–1952
Brigadier Sir Edgar Williams 1952–1980
Dr Robin Fletcher 1980–1989
Sir Anthony Kenny 1989–1999
Dr John Rowett 1999–2004
Sir Colin Lucas 2004–2009
Professor Don Markwell 2009–2012
Dr Andrew Graham Acting Warden 2012–2013
Charles R. Conn 2013–2018
Dr Elizabeth Kiss August 2018

List of Rhodes Scholars

References

Further reading 
 Philip Ziegler. Legacy: Cecil Rhodes, the Rhodes Trust and Rhodes Scholarships (Yale University Press, 2008); 388 pp. .
 R.W. Johnson. Look Back in Laughter: Oxford's Postwar Golden Age (Threshold Press, 2015); 260 pp. . Has a critical account of the decline of the Rhodes Trust under Warden John Rowett, and commends recovery under Wardens Donald Markwell and Charles R. Conn.

Books and articles by former Wardens of Rhodes House, Oxford:
 Anthony Kenny, The History of the Rhodes Trust. Oxford, England: Oxford University Press, 2001.
 Donald Markwell, "Instincts to Lead": On Leadership, Peace, and Education, 2013.
Charles R. Conn, Thinking About Historical Legacies: Looking for Just Principles and Processes: IHJR, 2018.

External links 
 
 Virtual tour of Rhodes House

 
1928 establishments in England
Buildings and structures of the University of Oxford
Departments of the University of Oxford
Educational charities based in the United Kingdom
Grade II* listed buildings in Oxfordshire
Herbert Baker buildings and structures
Houses completed in 1928
Libraries of the University of Oxford
Cecil Rhodes